The 2019 Bratislava Open was a professional tennis tournament played on clay courts. It was the first edition of the tournament which was part of the 2019 ATP Challenger Tour. It took place in Bratislava, Slovakia between 17 and 23 June 2019.

Singles main-draw entrants

Seeds

 1 Rankings are as of 10 June 2019.

Other entrants
The following players received wildcards into the singles main draw:
  Jonáš Forejtek
  David Juras
  Lukáš Klein
  Jiří Lehečka
  Péter Makk

The following players received entry into the singles main draw using their ITF World Tennis Ranking:
  Peter Heller
  Vít Kopřiva
  Skander Mansouri
  Pietro Rondoni
  Jeroen Vanneste

The following players received entry from the qualifying draw:
  Lucas Gerch
  Michael Vrbenský

The following player received entry as a lucky loser:
  Danylo Kalenichenko

Champions

Singles

 Norbert Gombos def.  Attila Balázs 6–3, 3–6, 6–2.

Doubles

 Sander Gillé /  Joran Vliegen def.  Lukáš Klein /  Alex Molčan 6–2, 7–5.

References

2019 ATP Challenger Tour
2019 in Slovak tennis
June 2019 sports events in Europe
Bratislava Open